Utica Sr. High School is a public high school in Utica, Ohio.  The North Fork School District, named so because Utica, Ohio, is located on the North Fork of the Licking River, covers southern Knox County and Northern Licking County. North Fork School District includes 4 schools: two elementary schools, Utica Elementary, (145 Mill Street, Utica, Ohio) and Newton Elementary School, (6645 Mt. Vernon Road, Newark, Ohio); a junior high school, Utica Jr. High, (260 North Jefferson Street, Utica, Ohio); and a senior high school, Utica Sr. High, (260 North Jefferson Street, Utica, Ohio).  With school colors of scarlet and gray, the school's  nickname is the Redskins and mascot is the Utica Redskin.

See also
 Native American mascot controversy
 Sports teams named Redskins

References

External links
 District Website

High schools in Licking County, Ohio
Public high schools in Ohio